Pleasant Hill is an unincorporated community in Stone County, Arkansas, United States.

References

Unincorporated communities in Stone County, Arkansas
Unincorporated communities in Arkansas